Sean Patrick McPherson (November 23, 1970 – April 26, 2018) was an American politician.

McPherson was born in Goose Creek, South Carolina. His father served in the United States Navy. After his father's retirement from the United States Navy, McPherson and his family lived in Newton, Kansas. He enlisted in the United States Navy after graduating high school. McPherson then worked for Intel Corporation in Rio Rancho, New Mexico. McPherson later taught at Rapid City Christian School, and served as pastor of the Real Life Church in Rapid City since 2010. He was elected to the South Dakota House of Representatives in 2017, as a Republican from District 32. In February 2017, McPherson was diagnosed with cancer. He died on April 26, 2018, in Rapid City, South Dakota.

In the 2018 elections, McPherson and Scyller Borglum earned the Republican Party's nomination for the 32nd district's two seats, even though McPherson had died of cancer. Governor Dennis Daugaard appointed Borglum to fill McPherson's vacant seat on August 8.

References

1970 births
2018 deaths
People from Goose Creek, South Carolina
People from Newton, Kansas
Politicians from Rapid City, South Dakota
People from Rio Rancho, New Mexico
Deaths from cancer in South Dakota
Republican Party members of the South Dakota House of Representatives
United States Navy sailors
United States Navy personnel of the Gulf War
American Protestant ministers and clergy
Educators from South Dakota
Military personnel from South Carolina
Military personnel from South Dakota
20th-century American politicians